Art for Starters is a band from Mesa, Arizona. It is essentially former Before Braille frontman David Jensen's solo project.

History

While still a member of Before Braille, David Jensen would constantly demo new songs for a project that he called Art for Starters. Some of those songs, such as Limb from Limb, Unfit, and Secret No. 7, would later be recorded with  Before Braille. At one point, Jensen claims to have filled over fifty tapes with demos for this "project" that he never intended to pursue. Then in 2005, it appears that drug abuse led to Before Braille's demise.

Having been greatly trouble by the loss of his band, Jensen would spend many nights demoing new material on a cheap laptop to relieve the "stress and grime associated with the Before Braille" mess, while working as a night-watchman. It was while making these "bedroom recordings" that Jensen finally decided to go it alone. He had become tired of all the trouble that came with working in a band, and decided that he wanted to be solely responsible for his own musical future.

This led Jensen to record his first album as Art for Starters. The circumstances surrounding the recording itself are quite interesting. In late 2006, Jensen put together a band and recorded what would become his double-LP debut, Drugs Made My Favorite Bands, Drugs Ruined My Favorite People in two locations, Flying Blanket Studios and Bubbles Bounce Studios, after which mastering took place during an almost 28-hour marathon. Immediately thereafter, Jensen left the United States to teach English in South Korea.

When Jensen finally returned from Asia, it became time to release the album and to promote it with a tour. To do so, he had to recruit musicians who could replicate what he had done almost alone in the studio. After grouping together with musicians from many other local bands, including Chad Martin and Brad Cole from Fivespeed, David Marquez from the Sweetbleeders, Ree Boado from Lesser Heroes and Dearspeak, and then finally Ashley Taylor from Splitlips (who would later work again with David Jensen in Loyal Wife), a band was born.

Art for Starters finally released its first record, a double album titled Drugs Made my Favorite Bands, Drugs Ruined My Favorite People, by playing two separate shows, one to showcase the album's acoustic disc, and the other to showcase its rock disc. Both the record, as well as the live band, were immediately welcomed by the critics. Interest in Art for Starters would quickly grow and allow the live band to share the stage with national acts such as Taking Back Sunday and Dear and the Headlights

Unfortunately, just a few months later, the live band fizzled out and disappeared.  According to reports, the acrimonious break-up occurred over a dispute over t-shirts. While it does not appear that Art for Starters will continue as a large group project, especially since David Jensen has gone on to start a new band called Loyal Wife, Jensen plans to continue releasing his own personal recordings under the Art for Starters moniker.

Discography

Albums

Compilations
 This is Flying Blanket, Vol. 1 (Common Wall Media, 2008)
Song: I Went to Church Instead
 The Shizz Presents...AM or PM, I Don't Know (Shizz Records, 2009)
Song: The Bone Stopped The Bullet
 Sunset Alliance Discography 2005-2011 (Sunset Alliance, 2011)
Various former releases
 You Heard Us Back When, Vol. 6 (Zia Records, 2012)
Song: Diction (The Beverly Hills Song)

Band members

FEATURED ON RECORDINGS
 David Jensen - vocals, guitars
 Spencer Reed- bass
 Chuckie Duff - bass
 Chad Martin - drums
 Bob Hoag - drums, keys

LIVE BAND (2009)
 David Jensen - vocals, guitars
 Ashley Taylor - vocals
 Ree Boado - vocals, keys, synth
 Chad Martin - drums
 Brad Cole - guitar
 David Marquez - bass
 Spencer Reed - bass
 Rajiv Patel - guitar
 Loren Brinton - drums

References

External links
 Art for Starters Official Website
 Art for Staters Official MySpace
 Dave Jensen's Art for Starters MySpace Page
 Sunset Alliance Records

Indie rock musical groups from Arizona
Musical groups established in 2006